Anne Tran (born 27 April 1996) is a French badminton player. Tran was the women's doubles champion at the 2013 and 2017 French National Championships. She was part of the French junior team that won the silver medal at the  2013 European Junior Championships, and in 2015 she won the silver medal in the girls' doubles, also bronze medals in the mixed doubles and team events. Tran clinched the silver medal at the 2018 European Championships in the women's doubles event partnered with Émilie Lefel, making them as the first French women's doubles players won a medal at that category.

Achievements

European Games 
Women's doubles

European Championships 
Women's doubles

European Junior Championships 
Girls' doubles

Mixed doubles

BWF World Tour (2 runners-up) 
The BWF World Tour, which was announced on 19 March 2017 and implemented in 2018, is a series of elite badminton tournaments sanctioned by the Badminton World Federation (BWF). The BWF World Tour is divided into levels of World Tour Finals, Super 1000, Super 750, Super 500, Super 300 (part of the HSBC World Tour), and the BWF Tour Super 100.

Women's doubles

Mixed doubles

BWF International Challenge/Series (9 titles, 8 runners-up) 
Women's doubles

Mixed doubles

  BWF International Challenge tournament
  BWF International Series tournament
  BWF Future Series tournament

References

External links 
 
 

1996 births
Living people
Sportspeople from Neuilly-sur-Seine
French female badminton players
French people of Vietnamese descent
Badminton players at the 2019 European Games
European Games bronze medalists for France
European Games medalists in badminton